The Wholesome Meat Act (also called "Equal To" law) is a United States federal law passed by the 90th United States Congressional session and enacted into law by United States President Lyndon B. Johnson on December 15, 1967, amending the Federal Meat Inspection Act of 1906 which established a statute for federal meat inspection programs. It requires that states have inspection programs "equal to" that of the federal government which are administered by the Food Safety and Inspection Service (FSIS) of the United States Department of Agriculture (USDA).

See also
 Humane Slaughter Act

References

External links
"Meat Inspection" at the Texas A&M University

1967 in law
1967 in American law
Food law
90th United States Congress
United States federal agriculture legislation
Food safety in the United States
United States federal health legislation
1967 in American politics
Meat inspection
Veterinary medicine in the United States